Edisto is an unincorporated community and census-designated place in Orangeburg County, South Carolina, United States. Its population was 2,058 as of the 2020 census. U.S. Route 601 passes through the community.

Geography

Demographics

2020 census

Note: the US Census treats Hispanic/Latino as an ethnic category. This table excludes Latinos from the racial categories and assigns them to a separate category. Hispanics/Latinos can be of any race.

References

Unincorporated communities in Orangeburg County, South Carolina
Unincorporated communities in South Carolina
Census-designated places in Orangeburg County, South Carolina
Census-designated places in South Carolina